Afuri (also known as Afuri Izakaya) is a chain of ramen restaurants, based in Tokyo, Japan.

History 
The original noodle shop opened at the base of Mount Afuri in 2001. Founder Hiroto Nakamura partnered with Taichi Ishizuki to open a location in southeast Portland's Buckman neighborhood in 2016. Since then, three additional locations have opened in the Portland metropolitan area, in downtown and northwest Portland as well as Beaverton. There are also locations in California, Canada (Vancouver), Hong Kong, Portugal, and Singapore.

In 2020, plans were announced to expand into northwest Portland. The restaurant opened in the Northwest District's Slabtown district in 2022.

See also
 List of Japanese restaurants
 List of restaurants in Tokyo

References

External links

  (United States)

2001 establishments in Japan
Buckman, Portland, Oregon
Japanese restaurants in Oregon
Japanese restaurants in Portland, Oregon
Japanese-American culture in California
Japanese-American culture in Oregon
Japanese-Canadian culture
Northwest District, Portland, Oregon
Ramen shops
Restaurant chains
Restaurants established in 2001
Restaurants in Beaverton, Oregon
Restaurants in California
Restaurants in Hong Kong
Restaurants in Portugal
Restaurants in Singapore
Restaurants in Tokyo
Restaurants in Vancouver
Southwest Portland, Oregon